"Ain't No Grave" is a song performed by Bethel Music and Molly Skaggs which was released as a promotional single from Bethel Music's eleventh live album, Victory (2019), on January 4, 2019. The song was written by Jonathan David Helser, Melissa Helser and Molly Skaggs, with Claude Ely receiving a posthumous credit for the interpolation of his identically titled original composition. Ed Cash produced the single. The song peaked at No. 17 on the US Hot Christian Songs chart despite not being an official single.

Background
"Ain't No Grave" was initially released by Bethel Music on January 4, 2019, as one of four promotional singles from Victory, in the lead-up to the album's release which was slated for January 25, 2019. Molly Skaggs shared the story behind the song, saying:

Composition

Commercial performance
The song debuted on the US Hot Christian Songs chart at No. 40 on the issue week of January 19, 2019. After the release of Victory, it jumped to No. 27. In its fifteenth week on the chart, the song peaked at No. 17.

Music videos
Bethel Music released the live music video of "Ain't No Grave" with Molly Skaggs leading the song during a worship service at Bethel Church through their YouTube channel on January 5, 2019. The lyric video of the song was released on January 25, 2019, on YouTube by Bethel Music. An acoustic performance video shot on location in North Carolina, with Skaggs singing was published on YouTube on September 11, 2019.

Charts

Weekly charts

Year-end charts

References

External links
  on PraiseCharts

2019 songs
Bethel Music songs
Songs written by Ed Cash